Joris De Loore was the defending champion but lost in the final to Arthur Fils.

Fils won the title after defeating De Loore 6–1, 7–6(7–4) in the final.

Seeds

Draw

Finals

Top half

Bottom half

References

External links
Main draw
Qualifying draw

Oeiras Indoors II - 1